The 2004–05 Vermont Catamounts women's ice hockey season was the team's final season in the ECAC. Led by head coach Dennis Miller, the Catamounts had 5 victories, compared to 26 defeats and 3 ties. Their conference record was 3 victories, 17 defeats and 0 ties.

Regular season

Schedule

Team records
Individual Single Season Goaltending Record, Most Minutes, 2010:55, Kami Cote (2004–05)
Individual Single Season Goaltending Record, Most Games Played, 34, Kami Cote (2004–05)

References

Vermont Catamounts Women's Ice Hockey Season, 2004-05
Vermont Catamounts women's ice hockey seasons
Vermont Catamounts women's ice
Vermont Catamounts women's ice